Thomas Bowstead Wilson (15 August 1882 – 11 October 1961)  was Archdeacon of Worcester from 1944 until his death.
  
Wilson was educated at Charterhouse and Pembroke College, Cambridge and ordained deacon in 1906 and priest in 1907. After a curacy at Wakefield Cathedral he was Missioner of the Pembroke College, Cambridge Mission at Walworth. He held incumbencies in Suckley, Wolverley and Hartlebury before his archdeacon’s appointment.

References

People educated at Charterhouse School
Alumni of Pembroke College, Cambridge
Archdeacons of Worcester
1882 births
1961 deaths